Pass Over is a 2018 American drama film directed by Spike Lee and starring Jon Michael Hill, Julian Parker, Ryan Hallahan and Blake DeLong.  It is a filmed performance of the play of the same name by Antoinette Nwandu.

Cast
Jon Michael Hill as Moses
Julian Parker as Kitch
Ryan Hallahan as Master
Blake DeLong as Ossifer

Production
The film was shot in 2017 at the Steppenwolf Theatre in Chicago.

Release
The film premiered at the 2018 Sundance Film Festival.  It was then released via Amazon Prime on April 20, 2018.

Reception
The film has  rating on Rotten Tomatoes.  Chuck Bowen of Slant Magazine awarded the film two stars out of four.  Chris Nashawaty of Entertainment Weekly graded the film a B.  Nick Allen of RogerEbert.com awarded the film three and a half stars.  Bradley Gibson of Film Threat gave the film a 8 out of 10.

The Hollywood Reporter gave it a positive review, calling it "More powerful than its filmed-play format might suggest."

References

External links
 
 

American drama films
Filmed stage productions
Films shot in Chicago
Films directed by Spike Lee
American films based on plays
Amazon Prime Video original films
2010s English-language films
2010s American films